Ugly Americans is a half-hour animated comedy series created by Devin Clark that ran on Comedy Central from March 17, 2010 to April 25, 2012. On April 21, 2010 Comedy Central announced that they had ordered 7 additional episodes of Ugly Americans, which began airing in October 2010 totaling 14 episodes for the first season. The second season consists of 17 episodes; the first 10 aired in the summer of 2011 and the remaining 7 in the spring of 2012. A total of 31 episodes have been produced over two seasons.

Series overview
{| class="wikitable plainrowheaders" style="text-align:center;"
|-
! colspan="2" rowspan="2" |Season
! rowspan="2" |Episodes
! colspan="2" |Originally aired
|-
! First aired
! Last aired
|-
 |style="background: #8B0000;"|
 |1
 |14
 |
 |
|-
 |style="background: #36454f;"|
 |2
 |17
 |
 |
|}

Episodes

Season 1 (2010)
The first season consists of 14 episodes the first seven of which aired in the spring of 2010 and the remaining seven in the fall of 2010.

Season 2 (2011–12)
On December 15, 2010, Comedy Central announced that they picked up the show for a 17-episode second season. The first ten episodes aired in the summer of 2011 following new episodes of Futurama. On January 31, 2012, Comedy Central announced that the series will move back to Wednesdays to air the remaining seven episodes on March 14, 2012, following South Park. Among the guest stars lined up for the remainder of the season are Ed Helms, Janeane Garofalo, Lisa Lampanelli, H. Jon Benjamin, Abby Elliott, Bobby Moynihan and Dan Fogler.

Ratings Graph

References

External links 
 

Lists of American adult animated television series episodes
Lists of American sitcom episodes
Lists of Canadian adult animated television series episodes
Lists of Canadian sitcom episodes